The Municipality of Ste. Rose is a rural municipality (RM) in the Canadian province of Manitoba.

History

The RM was incorporated on January 1, 2015 via the amalgamation of the RM of Ste. Rose and the Town of Sainte Rose du Lac. It was formed as a requirement of The Municipal Amalgamations Act, which required that municipalities with a population less than 1,000 amalgamate with one or more neighbouring municipalities by 2015. The Government of Manitoba initiated these amalgamations in order for municipalities to meet the 1997 minimum population requirement of 1,000 to incorporate a municipality.

Communities
 Laurier (designated place)
 Ste. Amélie
 Ste. Rose du Lac (unincorporated urban community)
 Valpoy

Demographics 
In the 2021 Census of Population conducted by Statistics Canada, Ste.

Attractions 

 Laurier railway station
 Sainte Rose du Lac Airport

References 

Rural municipalities in Manitoba
2015 establishments in Manitoba
Manitoba municipal amalgamations, 2015
Populated places established in 2015